The Bordeleau Bridge is a covered bridge of farm type, located in Saint-Severin, in Quebec, Canada.

History 
The first bridge built at this location dates back to 1875. The bridge was rebuilt twice, in 1895 and 1915 and was equipped with a roof in 1932 by the Department of Colonization. Metal templates were installed in 1988 and the paneling and the deck repaired in 1997. In October 2001, it was closed to traffic by the Ministry of Transportation to repair extensive damage to its structure which allowed it reopened the following year.

Name 
The name comes from the Bordeleau family that was present in the vicinity of the bridge during construction.

Color 
The bridge is now red with white trim but was formerly white with green trim.

References

See also 
 List of covered bridges in Quebec

Mékinac Regional County Municipality
Bridges completed in 1932
Buildings and structures in Mauricie
Covered bridges in Canada